Flatidae are a family of fulgoroid planthoppers. They are cosmopolitan in distribution and are distinguished from others in the superfamily by a combination of characters. Like all other planthoppers, they suck phloem sap of plants. Some species are known to communicate with vibrations through the plant stems. Communication may be with mates, or with ants that tend the nymphs, protecting them and gathering honeydew secretions. Adults of some species have brightly coloured forewings which are tougher and known as tegmina unlike the membranous hindwings which are used for flight. Although a few can be identified by their coloration, most species requires dissection and examination under a microscope with access to literature on already described species.

There are two subfamilies within the family. In the subfamily Flatinae, the body of adults is flattened laterally and the tegmina are tent-like. In the Flatoidinae, the body is not laterally compressed and the tegmina are not as tent-like and sometimes held horizontally. The wing venation is distinctive in that the veins in the anal region are nodose, and the costal area has numerous cross veins. The antennae are small and the first segment is collar-like and small. The second segment is longer and ends in a bulge and a flagellum arises from it. They have two ocelli. Nymphs have a tail of waxy filaments.

Subfamilies and genera
Genera within the family Flatidae include:

Flatinae
Auth.: Spinola, 1839; selected genera:

tribe Ceryniini Distant, 1906
 Adelidoria Metcalf, 1952
 Adexia Melichar, 1901
 Bythopsyrna Melichar, 1901
 Cerynia Stål, 1862
tribe Flatini Spinola, 1839
 subtribe Flatina Spinola, 1839
 Flata Fabricius, 1798
 Flatomorpha Melichar, 1901
 subtribe Lawanina Melichar, 1923
 Cromna Walker, 1857
 Lawana Distant, 1906
 Oryxa Melichar, 1901
 subtribe Phyllyphantina Melichar, 1923
 Paracromna Melichar, 1901
 Phyllyphanta Amyot & Audinet-Serville, 1843
 subtribe Scarpantina Melichar, 1923
 Scarpanta Stål, 1862
 Scarpantina Melichar, 1901
 subtribe Siphantina Melichar, 1923
 Siphanta Stål, 1862
tribe Nephesini Distant, 1906
 subtribe Cryptoflatina Melichar, 1923
 Cryptoflata Melichar, 1901
 Metcalfa Caldwell & Martorell, 1951
 Ormenaria Metcalf & Bruner, 1948
 Ormenoides Melichar, 1923
 subtribe Nephesina Distant, 1906
 Neomelicharia Kirkaldy, 1903
 Nephesa Amyot & Audinet-Serville, 1843
 subtribe Phaedolina Melichar, 1923
 Phaedolus Karsch, 1890
 subtribe Pseudoflatina Melichar, 1923
 Caesonia Stål, 1866
 Colgar Kirkaldy, 1900
 Colgaroides Distant, 1910 - Planthoppers
 Dalapax Amyot & Audinet-Serville, 1843
 Gyaria Stål, 1862
 Gyariella Schmidt, 1924
 Pauliana Lallemand, 1950
 Rhinophantia Melichar, 1901
tribe Phantiini Melichar, 1923
 Mesophantia Melichar, 1901
 Microflata Melichar, 1901
 Phantia Fieber, 1866
tribe Phromniini Distant, 1906
 Dermoflata Melichar, 1901
 Flatida White, 1846 (= Phromnia Stål, 1862)
 Flatina Melichar, 1901
 Flatosoma Melichar, 1901
 Paraflata Melichar, 1901
 Poeciloflata Melichar, 1901
tribe Poekillopterini Kirkaldy, 1907
 Poekilloptera Latreille, 1796
tribe Selizini Distant, 1906
 Jamella Kirkaldy, 1906 (J. australiae, or pandanus planthopper, pest to Pandanus tectorius)
 Seliza Stål, 1862
tribe Sisciini Melichar, 1923
 Siscia Stål, 1870

Flatoidinae
Auth.: Melichar, 1901

 Atracis Stål, 1866
 Atracodes Melichar, 1902
 Bochara Distant, 1906
 Cerfennia Stål, 1870
 Cisatra Melichar, 1923
 Dendrona Melichar, 1923
 Flataloides Metcalf, 1938
 Flatarina Metcalf & Bruner, 1948
 Flatarissa Metcalf & Bruner, 1948
 Flatoides Guérin-Ménéville, 1844
 Flatoidessa Melichar, 1923
 Flatoidinus Melichar, 1923
 Flatosaria Melichar, 1923
 Franciscus Distant, 1910
 Gaja Distant, 1906
 Lichena Melichar, 1901
 Lichenopsis Schmidt, 1912
 Melichitona Metcalf, 1952
 Paraflatoides Melichar, 1923
 Phalaenomorpha Amyot & Audinet-Serville, 1843
 Porophloeus Melichar, 1902
 Pseudoflatoides Metcalf, 1938
 Uxantis Stål, 1870
 Uysanus Distant, 1908

incertae sedis

 Afrexoma Fennah, 1976
 Afrophantia Fennah, 1958
 Afrormenis Fennah, 1958
 Amasha Medler, 1992
 Anatracis Fennah, 1958
 Anzora Medler, 1986
 Bahuflata Dlabola, 1979
 Betracis Medler, 1988
 Boretsis Medler, 1996
 Brysora Medler, 2000
 Budginmaya Fletcher & Moir, 2009
 Catracis Medler, 1988
 Comnar Medler, 1988
 Cromgar Medler, 2000
 Cromnella Fennah, 1969
 Cryomna Medler, 2000
 Cyclopterum Gnezdilov & O'Brien, 2014
 Demina Medler, 2000
 Desanta Medler, 2000
 Diastracis Medler, 1988
 Dixamflata Stroinski, Malenovský & Swierczewski, 2016
 Dworena Medler, 1986
 Erotana Medler, 2000
 Eugyaria Synave, 1962
 Falcophantis Fletcher, 1988
 Garanta Medler, 2000
 Humgar Medler, 2001
 Ijagar Medler, 2000
 Insulume Medler, 1999
 Karrama Medler, 1988
 Kesaflata Stroinski, Malenovsky & Swierczewski, 2016
 Kirkamflata Swierczewski, Malenovsky & Stroinski, 2014
 Lasura Medler, 1992
 Lemaria Medler, 1988
 Madoxychara Stroinski & Swierczewski, 2013
 Malleja Medler, 1990
 Menora Medler, 1999
 Metcracis Medler, 1993
 Miniscia Medler, 1991
 Narowalenus Shakila, 1991
 Neocalauria Synave, 1957
 Neomistaria Yang & Chen, 2015
 Neosephena Medler, 2000
 Neovariata Shakila, 1984
 Ortracis Medler, 1996
 Paracalauria Synave, 1962
 Parasiphanta Fletcher, 1988
 Perinetella Synave, 1956
 Persepolia Dlabola & Safavi, 1972
 Peyrierasus Stroinski & Swierczewski, 2013
 Phaiophantia Lindberg, 1958
 Planata Medler, 1999
 Riodeorolix Lindberg, 1956
 Safroka Medler, 2001
 Samcerus Medler, 1993
 Saurana Medler, 1992
 Scarpuna Medler, 2006
 Shadaka Medler, 2000
 Soares Stroiński & Świerczewski, 2012
 Sogalabana Stroiński & Świerczewski, 2014
 Sosephena Medler, 1990
 Staliana Medler, 1988
 Stenume Medler, 1999
 Talopsus Medler, 1989
 Taparella Medler, 1989
 Tisia Dlabola, 1981
 Tormenis Medler, 1999
 Trisephena Medler, 1990
 Umidena Medler, 1992
 Walena Medler, 1999

References

External links
 Pictures of Australian Flatidae genera
 Illustrated overview of Fulgoroidea

 
Auchenorrhyncha families
Fulgoromorpha